Fiona Ma (born March 4, 1966) is an American accountant and politician. She has been serving as the California state treasurer since January 7, 2019. She previously served as a member of the California Board of Equalization from 2015 to 2019, the California State Assembly (2006–2012), and the San Francisco Board of Supervisors (2002–2006).

A member of the Democratic Party, Ma was the first Asian American woman to serve as California Assembly Speaker Pro Tempore, the second highest-ranking office in the California Assembly. Ma is also only the second Certified Public Accountant (CPA) to be elected to the Board of Equalization. She was selected as Chairperson of the California Board of Equalization in 2016, and ordered three external audits of the agency.

Early life and education
Ma is the oldest of three children born to William and Sophia Ma, both Chinese immigrants. Her grandfather, Lieutenant General , was the first mayor of Kunming, Yunnan.

Born and raised in New York, she attended Baker Elementary School before graduating from Great Neck North Middle and High Schools. Her father, Dr. William Ma, was a mechanical engineer who later specialized in construction claims and litigation before he retired. Her mother, Sophia (née Doo), was a high school art teacher for 20 years before moving the family to San Francisco to be closer to her parents. Rev William Doo was posted as a minister at the San Francisco Swatow Christian Church in San Francisco's Sunset District.

Ma earned a Bachelor of Science degree in accounting from Rochester Institute of Technology, a Master of Science in taxation from Golden Gate University, and a Master of Business Administration from Pepperdine University. She is a CPA and member of the Aspen Institute's 2009 Class of Aspen-Rodel Fellows.

Career 
In 1993, Ma worked at Ernst & Young, one of the "big six" accounting firms at the time. However, seeing few female managers and even fewer female partners during her time with the firm, she decided to start her own accounting practice with an associate.

In 1994, Ma was elected president of the Asian Business Association, which led to her first involvement with politics, lobbying San Francisco City Hall and the Sacramento State Capitol for business issues that affected women and minorities. As a result of her work on behalf of the Small Business Association at that same time, she was elected in 1995 as a delegate to the White House Conference on Small Business under President Bill Clinton. Ma's advocacy work in that role helped lead to socially responsible contracting for minorities and women in San Francisco, and produced a report to Congress on the 60 top policy recommendations to help small businesses grow and prosper in the 21st century.

Ma is an active member of the California Society of Certified Public Accountants (CalCPA), Governmental Accounting Standards Advisory Council (GASAC). She was also a Hunt Keane Fellow in 2019, Cohort 6. Additionally, she is a member of the Screen Actors Guild (SAG-AFTRA) and had a small role in the short film My Name Is Moe.

Ma was appointed to the Assessment Appeals Board of San Francisco by the San Francisco Board of Supervisors in 1995. That same year, she started her public service career as a part-time district representative for then-State Senator John Burton. She served as John Burton's district representative until her election to the San Francisco Board of Supervisors in 2002. She was responsible for helping constituents with Medi-Cal, Workers' Compensation, Unemployment Insurance, Franchise and Employment Development Department taxes, and professional licensing.

San Francisco Board of Supervisors 
Ma was later elected to the San Francisco County Board of Supervisors from 2002 to 2006 representing District 4, the Sunset District, Outer Sunset, Parkside, Outer Parkside, and Pine Lake Park. While serving on that board, her major legislative push was a human rights campaign to shut down massage parlors who illegally trafficked persons into the country and used them to run illegal prostitution rings. Following the passage of Proposition 209, which barred public institutions from considering sex, race or ethnicity, she led the effort to create the city's Disadvantaged Business Enterprise (DBE) program to enable small businesses to more easily participate in public works projects, aiming to broaden the scope of inclusion. As a Supervisor, she also started her advocacy regarding banning toxins from children's toys - passing Ordinance Number 060107 to "prohibit the manufacture, sale, or distribution in commerce of any toy or child-care article…if it contains bisphenol-A or other specified chemicals."

California Assembly 
Fiona Ma was first elected to represent California's 19th Assembly District from November 2006 to November 2012 (serving the maximum three terms). She was the 112th woman to be elected to the California legislature and the first Asian woman to serve as Speaker pro Tempore since 1850.

Ma won the Democratic nomination to represent California's 19th Assembly District against fellow Democrat Janet Reilly in the state primary election of June 6, 2006. The campaign was one of the more expensive legislative primary races in the state of California.

On November 7, 2006, Ma received 70 percent of the votes and defeated her two opponents for California Assembly, Republican Howard Epstein and Green Barry Hermanson. She replaced Leland Yee as 19th District assemblywoman. Her district included San Francisco, Daly City, Colma and Broadmoor, totaling some 420,000 constituents.

Ma was appointed Assembly majority whip by the speaker of the assembly, Fabian Núñez, a position which she held for 4 years. As Majority Whip, she marshaled votes to ensure the passage of legislation that affected public education, expanded healthcare access, and set in place environmental protections. In 2010, Speaker of the Assembly John Pérez appointed Ma to the leadership position of Speaker pro Tempore, a position which she held for her final 2 years as the California Assembly. As presiding officer and member of the leadership team, Ma guided assembly members through the daily business of the house, responds to parliamentary inquiries, issues rulings on points of order when necessary, and is responsible for guiding legislative priorities. Ma presided over a record-breaking 18-hour session to pass California's budget.

As an assemblywoman, Ma continued her work around toxic children's toys, authoring legislation banning toxic chemicals in products for babies and small children in assembly bill 1108. The bill came to be known as the "Rubber Duck Bill", so named because phthalates are often used in the manufacture of soft plastic toys and baby teethers. Arnold Schwarzenegger, then governor of California, signed the bill into law in October 2007; it took effect in January 2009. Ma's legislation was later incorporated into Senator Dianne Feinstein's federal Consumer Product Safety Improvement Act of 2008 signed by President George W. Bush on August 15, 2008. She also worked on the creation of statewide high-speed rail, granting equal rights to men and women to change their last names when they are married or become domestic partners, and was a co-author of SB 840, a bill that would create a single payer universal health care system throughout California.

Committee membership 

Standing committees:

 Committee on Accountability and Administrative Review
 Committee on Agriculture
 Committee on Appropriations
 Committee on Arts, Entertainment, Sports, Tourism, and Internet Media
 Committee on Business and Professions
 Committee on Governmental Organization
 Committee on Health
 Committee on Higher Education
 Committee on Housing and Community Development
 Committee on Labor and Employment
 Committee on Public Employees, Retirement and Social Security
 Committee on Public Safety
 Committee on Revenue and Taxation
 Committee on Utilities and Commerce

Select committees:
 Chair, Select Committee on Domestic Violence
 Select Committee on Alcohol And Drug Abuse
 Select Committee on Foster Care
 Select Committee on Preservation of California's Entertainment Industry
 Select Committee on Rail Transportation
 Select Committee on Regional Approaches To Addressing The State's Water Crisis
 Select Committee on Safety And Protection Of At-Risk Communities In California

Joint committees:
 Joint Committee on Fairs, Allocation, and Classification
 Joint Committee for the Protection of Lake Tahoe

California Board of Equalization 
On November 4, 2014, Ma won election to Board of Equalization district 2. She received 1,448,657 votes to win the election by 68.5% of the vote. District 2 covers nearly 10 million people along California's coastline from Oregon to Santa Barbara.

On, February 24, 2016, at the Board of Equalization (BOE) meeting in Culver City, the Board selected Ma as its chair. As chair, Ma also sits on the California Franchise Tax Board.

The California's Board of Equalization was created by voter initiative in 1879 to "equalize" property values/taxes. The board has broad regulatory and adjudicatory powers as a state tax board. The five-member Board meets monthly and is the only elected tax board in the country. The BOE administers more than 30 tax and fee programs. During fiscal year 2014–15, the BOE generated $60.5 billion of revenue. The BOE's monthly meetings offer taxpayers and other interested parties opportunities to participate in the formulation of rules and regulations adopted by the Board.

California state treasurer 

On May 17, 2016, Ma announced she was opening her campaign to run for California treasurer in the 2018 election. On June 5, 2018, she finished first in the nonpartisan open primary, and then defeated Republican Greg Conlon in the November 6 election receiving 7,825,587 votes – the most votes ever earned by a candidate for treasurer of California. On January 7, 2019, she was sworn in as the first woman of color and the second CPA to ever serve as California State Treasurer.
In the Assembly, Ma was one of California's most powerful legislators, and as State Treasurer, she continued developing new laws and policies. In 2019 she sponsored 15 pieces of legislation, supported 25 bills, and provided technical support to 30 others, focusing on her priority areas of fiscal accountability, green financing, high-speed rail, affordable housing and consumer protections.

Head banker and strengthening state finances 
In her first year in office, Wall Street's Fitch Ratings and Moody's upgraded California's general obligation bonds, citing improved fiscal management, and stating California's budget reserves had "never been stronger". Ma stated her goal to help create "lower borrowing costs, a favorable interest rate environment, improved ratings, and a continued commitment to building reserves". In the first quarter of 2019, Ma sold more bonds than any other state treasurer in America, including a different bond issuance almost every week during March and April. From July to December 2019, her office sold an additional $7.65 billion of bonds. In November 2019, the nonpartisan California Legislative Analyst's Office reported on the Treasurer's cost-cutting impact stating: "the State Treasurer has been able to refinance much of the state's bond debt. Consequently, much of the state's outstanding debt now carries a lower interest rate resulting in lower annual costs."
Overall in 2019, Ma's office oversaw $85 billion in bonds and $85 billion to $100 billion (an all-time high) in short term investments. "I believe in checks and balances, accountability and also being proactive," Ma told Bloomberg news. Ma's priorities for California's bond program include:
 saving taxpayer's billions of dollars by refinancing at lowering interest rates
 solving the housing crisis with more bonds allocated to affordable and low cost housing
 green bonds which promote environmental benefits for the people of California
 broadening efforts to include women, minority and veteran-owned broker-dealer firms to manage bond issuances
 helping local city governments to manage their finances soundly
 statewide infrastructure projects and voter approved bonds such as clean water and high-speed rail.

Green financing and environmental policy 
Ma chaired the inaugural meeting of the California Green Bond Market Development Committee on June 5, 2019 to "establish California as the world's green bond leader" by developing standards for what qualifies as green bonds, and incorporating green bonds into the financing of state infrastructure projects.
Ma launched the Small Business Energy Efficiency Financing and the Affordable Multifamily Energy Efficiency Financing programs in October 2019 to help small business, nonprofits and affordable housing owners to reduce the cost of financing energy efficiency improvements. She also co-sponsored the California Recycling Market Development Act to promote California's recycling programs, AB 1583 authored by Assemblymember Susan Eggman and signed in to law by Governor Newsom.
Ma also chairs the California Alternative Energy and Advanced Transportation Financing Authority (CAEATFA), which assists the state in meeting its greenhouse gas goals and works with the private market. CAEATFA operates the CA Hub for Energy Efficiency Financing Program, which has provided more than $825 million in sales tax exclusions for over 200 green projects that support solar manufacturing, geothermal, renewable fuels, and biogas production. Ma also chairs the California Pollution Control Financing Authority (CPCFA), providing $16.2 billion in low-cost innovative financing to California businesses since 1972 to make California more economically prosperous and environmentally clean. CPCFA was the first statewide financing authority to sign the Green Bond Pledge, vowing to meet climate bond principles in all of its projects. CPCFA awarded $73.7 million in tax-exempt green bond financing in 2019 to CalPlant I, LLC, a company that will turn rice straw into medium density fiberboard, employing 115 full- time workers, 450 part-time harvest-season workers, and supporting 325 construction jobs to build this first-of-a-kind project. 
In December 2020, Ma's office enrolled the milestone 1,000th loan of the Residential Energy Efficiency Loan Program, to a Yuba County homeowner to install a highly efficient HVAC and smart thermostat.

Affordable housing 
Ma's office oversees private activity bonds and state housing tax credits that are used to build and maintain low-income housing and keep rents in these units affordable for 55 years. In 2019, her office sold over $180 million of bonds for the California Department of Veterans Affairs (CalVet) program to provide affordable loans to veterans. 
Ma also sold $500 million (in 2019) and $450 million (in 2020) in revenue bonds for California's No Place Like Home (NPLH) program, a groundbreaking California effort to develop permanent supportive housing for homeless and mentally ill persons. This "social bond," to fund projects that produce positive social outcomes, won the Bond Buyer Magazine's Deal of the Year award in 2020.
In September 2020, Ma released policy reports on affordable housing for community college students, working with the Southern California Association of Non-Profit Housing. With the California School Finance Authority (CSFA), Ma's office issued $87 million in bonds to build 352 beds for Santa Rosa Junior College.
In October 2020, the CTCAC chaired by Ma approved $91 million in tax credits for 2,846 units of low-income housing in counties heavily damaged by the Camp, Tubbs, Thomas, and Mendocino Complex wildfires in 2017 and 2018.

Protecting families, consumers and small business 
In June 2019, Ma announced the official launch of the CalSavers Retirement Savings Program (CalSavers), which offers an IRA retirement savings option to employees who don't currently have one through their employer. The program also offers an option for self-employed "gig" workers who don't work as traditional employees.

In October 2019, Ma announced that California's family college savings plan known as California's ScholarShare 529 had received a gold rating from Morningstar Inc, making it one of the four top college savings plan in the nation. In 2019, the "Scholar Dollars" program as part of ScholarShare 529 awarded more than $300,000 to 20 K-8 California public schools to fund technology, music, art, theater, computer science, sports, and other programs. In 2020, Ma moved to further protect these college savings accounts, sponsoring SB898 authored by State Sen. Bob Wieckowski, D-Fremont and signed by Gov. Newsom. The new law protects ScholarShare 529 accounts from being raided by debt collectors.

As part of Governor Gavin Newsom's Master Plan for Aging, Ma co-sponsored three bills addressing the needs of older adults, people with disabilities and family caregivers: AB 1287 (Nazarian), AB 1382 (Aguiar-Curry), and SB 611(Cabellero). In 2019, the Treasurer Office's CalABLE program was expanded to allow anyone with a disability diagnosed before the age of 26 to
open up an account and save up to $15,000 a year.

In 2020, as part of the California Infrastructure and Economic Development Bank (iBank), Ma began administering the California Rebuilding Fund, a new public-private partnership to support California's small businesses. The fund is part of the California Governor's Office of Economic Development.

High-speed rail 
In her first year as treasurer, Ma appointed Beverly Scott and Frederick Jordan to the California High-Speed Rail Peer Review Group. Ma also provided support to the SoCal-to-Las Vegas Brightline West high-speed rail project connecting Southern California and Las Vegas, Nevada when she announced approval of a $300 million bond issuance for the project. The $8-billion, 170-mile long line running along Interstate 15 is slated to start construction in 2023 with trains running by 2025. "This is going to be the biggest shot in the arm that we have ever seen," said Art Bishop, a councilman and former mayor in the San Bernardino County, California area, with an expected 600 permanent jobs generated and thousands of new homes in the region.

Cannabis banking 
Ma continued her efforts to regulate the legal marijuana industry, and on February 13, 2019, she was the highest-ranking government official to testify at the first congressional hearing to authorize "safe-harbor" banking services for marijuana businesses located in states which have legalized marijuana use. Ma pointed out that "the cannabis market in California alone is expected to exceed $5.1 billion" by 2020, but federal roadblocks prevent those funds from going through the banking system. Those huge amounts of cash are untraceable and can lead to violent crimes like armed-robbery and other illicit activities. In addition, Ma pointed out that marijuana-related businesses are forced to pay employees in cash and therefore these employees are unable to pay into the Social Security system, unable to get car loans or home mortgages, and even unable to pay into alimony and child support. In 2019, Ma sponsored SB 51, by Senator Majority Leader Bob Hertzberg, to allow private banks and credit unions to apply for state licensing which would allow licensed cannabis-related businesses to open accounts and deposit income.

Collecting sales tax revenue from Amazon 
On April 25, 2019, Governor Gavin Newsom signed legislation that Ma had pushed to require out-of-state and online retailers like eBay, Etsy, and Amazon (company) to collect sales taxes in line with the practices of local California businesses, eliminating an unfair advantage that Amazon and other out-of-state and online businesses had claimed. Ma had championed such legislation when she sat on the Board of Equalization, and during her time in the California Assembly since 2007.

COVID-19 pandemic 
During the COVID-19 pandemic beginning March 2020, all Ma's operations were considered essential services and kept fully-open and operational. Ma's office and agencies she chaired took the following actions:
 assembled resources for taxpayer relief, food sources for needy families, and financial resources for small business. 
 Extended deadlines for business for the CalSavers retirement program and supported Governor Newsom and the State Franchise Tax Board in extending deadlines for California tax returns.
 Launched $5 million emergency loan program for hospitals and health facilities in small, rural and district communities.
 Increased bond money available to build additional 4,054 units of affordable housing including the first housing to target LGBT elders in the Davis region.
 Pushed forward on $600 million in bonds for the Southern California to Las Vegas high speed rail project including 1,250 workforce housing units, 30,000 construction jobs and 1,000 permanent jobs.
In May 2020, Ma began operating the COVID-19 Emergency HELP Loan Program to provide financial assistance to health facilities impacted by the COVID-19 pandemic. Loans authorized include:
 $250,000 to Operation Samaha in San Diego to increase space for a drive-thru COVID-19 screening clinic and other renovation's.
 $250,000 to Asian American Drug Abuse Program in Los Angeles County
By May 2020, California had spent $2.2 billion on safety gear to prevent coronavirus infection. No-bid contracts were used because of the emergency and unprecedented need for personal protective equipment. The state's standard purchasing processes were disrupted and Ma's office, which normally just carries out final stages of financial transactions, took on an oversight role.

Accusations of impropriety
In summer of 2021, a former staffer filed a civil rights complaint against Ma, alleging sexual harassment and wrongful termination for declining the harassing behavior. In the court filings, Judith Blackwell complained that Ma created a hostile work environment by making overt and unwanted advances while the two shared a hotel room on a work trips. Such behavior included exposing her bare rear end to Blackwell on multiple occasions. Ma also showered Blackwell in gifts, such as jewelry, a prime parking spot and marijuana edibles, up until the time she was fired according to Politico. Ma is also accused of accepting inappropriate gifts.

Ma had also shared hotel rooms 13 times with her chief of staff over a two-year period. And while the practice of sharing rooms with subordinates does not violate departmental policy, the situation was criticized as, according to the Associated Press. Ma has denied any wrongdoing in her defense against Blackwell and has said the sharing of hotel rooms was a cost-saving measure.

Personal life 
She is married to Jason Hodge, a Ventura County firefighter of Native American descent and an Oxnard Port Commissioner with the Port of Hueneme in Ventura County. She also has a dog named Henry.

Political positions

Business taxes 
A top priority for Ma while on the Board of Equalization was to get everyone to pay "their fair share of taxes", particularly "the $8 billion in unpaid taxes in the underground economy." This included efforts to get Amazon to collect sales tax on transactions from third-party sellers as a way of helping local brick-and-mortar retailers to compete – estimated at between $431 million and $1.8 billion in new revenue for California every year.
In her first year, Ma also advocated for e-cigarettes to be taxed like tobacco products, as a way to deter vaping and smoking, and to pay for health-costs caused by tobacco use. Two years later in 2017, voters passed Prop. 56 with a nearly 2/3 majority, collecting $1.7 billion in new tobacco taxes which was spent on anti-smoking programs and funding Medi-Cal payments for the poor.
Ma also identified the cannabis industry as "the largest shadow economy in California" with "hundreds of millions of dollars that disappear into an underground cannabis economy". Her tireless efforts to regulate the industry, develop systems to "track and trace" all marijuana in California, and to develop legal banking mechanisms for marijuana businesses earned her the nickname of "chief marijuana tax collector".

Tax relief for citizens and small business 
After 2015's Valley Fire in Lake County left four dead and nearly 2,000 buildings destroyed, Ma proposed a new law (enacted the following year) that granted some tax relief to businesses that suffer losses from a natural disaster like the Valley Fire. 
Ma has also actively supported California's Earned Income Tax Credit to give cash back to low-income individuals, and promoted expansion of the program to minimum wage earners and independent contractors.

Clean government reforms 
Within months of joining the Board of Equalization, Ma became "very, very frustrated" with the agency's fiscal conditions and mishandling of state tax accounts. She called for the formation of an Auditing and Oversight Committee, and when she became Chairperson in 2016, initiated three external audits of the agency. The audits exposed a culture of mismanagement, nepotism and political use of state resources. Ma co-sponsored legislation to toughen campaign reporting requirements for BOE members. She then led the effort to ask the Governor to appoint a public trustee to take over the agency, and called on CA Attorney General Xavier Becerra to assign independent legal counsel for the agency. Ma laid out a list of reforms which was incorporated into the "Taxpayer Transparency and Fairness Act of 2017", the biggest restructuring of the Board of Equalization in its 138-year history. The law was signed by Governor Jerry Brown in June 2017 and supported by Assembly Speaker Anthony Rendon, Senate President Kevin de León, and former BOE member Controller Betty Yee.

Women and diversity 
Ma continued her lifelong commitment to promoting women and diversity in public office. In 2016, she received Emerge California's Woman of the Year Award and was a speaker at the Ascend Conference, the largest non-profit Pan-Asian business conference in America. Among her many other activities, Ma also celebrated Women's Equality Day at the Kelley House in Mendocino and spoke to students at the Future Chinese Leaders of America in Los Angeles.

Requiring consent to plastinate a corpse 
On February 23, 2007, Ma introduced a bill requiring commercial exhibitors of plastinated corpses to obtain a county permit, which would be dependent on proof of consent from the decedent or next of kin. It passed the Senate on August 15, 2008 and was vetoed by Governor Arnold Schwarzenegger on September 26, citing a budget delay.

Banning toxic chemicals 
Ma has passed legislation banning toxic chemicals in plastics and children's toys. As a Supervisor in San Francisco, she authored and passed Ordinance Number 060107 to "prohibit the manufacture, sale, or distribution in commerce of any toy or child-care article…if it contains bisphenol-A or other specified chemicals." This was the first ordinance of its kind. The goal of the ordinance was to place pressure on the California State Legislature and national government to follow suit. As a California State Legislator, she continued her work, passing A.B. 1108, which also banned toxic chemicals from children's toys. Her language was later used by Senator Dianne Feinstein in the federal Consumer Product Safety Improvement Act of 2008, signed into law in 2008.

Hepatitis B awareness and prevention 
At the age of 22, Ma learned that she had Hepatitis B (HBV), a virus that causes 80 percent of all liver cancer if left untreated and often shows no symptoms until it is almost too late. Almost 1.4 million Americans are infected with HBV, and more than half are Asian Pacific Islander Americans. An estimated one in ten are chronically infected with the virus. As a result of its high Asian population, San Francisco has one of the highest rates of liver cancer in the nation, and HBV-related liver cancer is the leading cause of cancer death among API men in California.

Ma assumed a leading role in the fight against Hepatitis B, serving as a spokesperson for San Francisco Hep B Free - the largest and most intensive healthcare campaign for APIs in the United States. It is widely considered a model for the nation in eliminating HBV in a regional area.

In 2008, Ma introduced Assembly Bill 158, which would have required the Department of Health Care Services to apply for a federal waiver to expand Medi-Cal eligibility for individuals with chronic Hepatitis B. She also introduced a resolution declaring May 2009 as Hepatitis B Awareness Month in California.

High-speed rail 
Ma is a longtime advocate of transportation solutions, the Joint author of Proposition 1-A and the convener of the High Speed Rail Caucus. Ma was one of the leading advocates of high-speed trains in California and one of its main campaigners traveling statewide promoting its environmental benefits and job creating effects . The proposition ultimately was approved by the voters in November 2008 maintaining critical funding after the Governor Schwarzenegger had proposed a major defunding of high-speed rail.

Non-profit and community involvement
Ma serves on the Board of Directors, and was a past Treasurer, for Curry Without Worry, a non-profit based in San Francisco. Since 2006, this organization has fed over 45,000 people.[8] She is also currently on the Board of Directors of CA Women Lead and Asian Inc. She is the Honorary Chair and spokesperson of the San Francisco Hep B Free Campaign; Honorary California Chair of the New Leaders Council, Board Advisory Committee for the James L. Brady Riding Program for Children with Disabilities, Board Advisory Committee for Family Connections, President of Board of Asian American Donor Program, and Board Advisory Committee of the SF Ethnic Dance Festival.

State and national outreach
Assembly member Ma has been active in promoting trade and fostering relationships between California and the Nation. As an Executive Board Member of the National Conference of State Legislators, she worked to keep California competitive with other states. She also served as the Western Region Director of Women in Government, the State Legislative Leaders Council, and was an Executive Board Member of the California Democratic Party.

International outreach
Since 1998, Ma has been on the forefront in promoting trade and commerce between California and Asia, leading legislative delegations to China, Taiwan, and Hong Kong. She has been a frequent speaker in the region promoting US interests in high-speed rail, agriculture, entertainment and education. She has also taken the lead to welcome foreign dignitaries visiting California in her elected capacities.
 
She has participated in various California trade delegations and has met with legislative leaders and decision-makers in India, Japan, South Korea, Singapore, France, Israel, Ireland and Iceland.

References

External links

Government website
Campaign website

San Francisco Hep B Free campaign

|-

1966 births
21st-century American politicians
21st-century American women politicians
Asian-American city council members
American accountants
American women of Chinese descent in politics
American women of Taiwanese descent in politics
Bai people
California politicians of Chinese descent
Golden Gate University alumni
Great Neck North High School alumni
Living people
Democratic Party members of the California State Assembly
Pepperdine University alumni
Rochester Institute of Technology alumni
San Francisco Board of Supervisors members
State treasurers of California
Women accountants
Women city councillors in California
Women state legislators in California
Democratic Party state constitutional officers of California